Skirroceras bayleanum is a Stephanoceratacean (ammonite) species belonging to the family Stephanoceratidae.

These fast-moving nektonic carnivores lived during the Jurassic period, in the Bajocian age.

Description

Distribution
Fossils of Skirroceras bayleanum are found in the Middle Jurassic Bajocian age marine strata of United Kingdom and France.

References 

 Geological Survey Professional Paper, Vol. 755-757

External links
 MNHN

Jurassic ammonites
Stephanoceratoidea